Elections to Chorley Borough Council were held on 10 June 2004.  One third of the council was up for election and the council stayed under no overall control.

After the election, the composition of the council was:

Election result

Results Map

Ward results

Adlington and Anderton

Brindle and Hoghton ward

Chorley East ward

Chorley North East ward

Chorley North West ward

Chorley South East ward

Chorley South West ward

Clayton-le-Woods and Whittle-le-Woods ward

Clayton-le-Woods North ward

Coppull ward

Eccleston and Mawdesley ward

=Euxton North ward

Heath Charnock and Rivington ward

Lostock ward

Wheelton and Withnell ward

References
2004 Chorley election result
Tories win two seats to close gap on Labour
 Chorley Borough Council Election 2004

2004
2004 English local elections
2000s in Lancashire